Taradale High School is a co-educational secondary school situated in Taradale, a suburb of Napier in the Hawkes Bay region of New Zealand. It caters for years 9–13. The school has an attendance roll of approximately 1036 students (ranging over the five years of age) as of November 2021.

Facilities
The school was originally constructed to the Nelson Two-Storey standard plan, like most New Zealand secondary schools built in the 1960s. The Nelson Two-Storey is distinguished by its two-storey H-shaped classroom blocks, with stairwells at each end of the block and a large ground floor toilet and cloak area on one side. Taradale has two Nelson 2H classroom blocks - A and B blocks.

The school is well resourced with modern facilities which include a learning support centre, a gymnasium, a music and drama suite, four computer suites, an additional suite of computers and VLN facilities in the library, an extensive technology complex and an attractive environment with extensive sports grounds. A new food technology/hospitality facility was commissioned in 2006 and has since been completed along with a dance studio as part of a major gymnasium refit. In 2017, a new state of the art science block has been built.

School achievements and history
The school opened on 3 February 1970, although some of the buildings were not yet complete or painted, and the playing fields were bare earth with stones and rocks. The science class had no equipment, and the library was short of books. The opening ceremony was not held until 17 July 1970, and the Minister of Education, Brian Talboys, was unable to attend and a replacement speaker was hastily organised. Of the original ten staff members, four left during the first year. Despite these problems, the school presented a concert involving every class at the end of the second term, and a basketball marathon set an endurance record for the Guinness Book of Records. The school magazine, then called Teamhar Leabhar (Gaelic for The Book of Tara), published its first issue.

The school grew rapidly over the next decade. B block was built in 1971–72 and C block in 1975. A mezzanine floor was added to the library in 1974, and the gymnasium opened in 1981. The roll increased to over 800 in 1976 and was then stable until 1984 when it increased to over 900. The school magazine become The Brooch in 1976.

In 1975 the local community decided that the school should have its own Board of Governors in place of the Napier High Schools Board. The school gained the right to internally assess all School Certificate subjects from 1977.

A connection with Tomakomai Commercial High School in Tomakomai, Hokkaidō, Japan, formed in 1979, with several Japanese students spending a year at Taradale. A second sister school relationship was formed with Samil Commercial High School in South Korea in 1993.

The school celebrated its 25th anniversary with a reunion during Easter 1995.

Taradale High School received unfavourable attention nationally when six pupils sodomised another student with a broomstick at a party at one of the students' homes on the evening of 17 October 2001. The boys were convicted of sexual assault and sentenced to between 2 and 2.5 years imprisonment.

References

External links
 Official site

Napier, New Zealand
Secondary schools in the Hawke's Bay Region
Schools in Napier, New Zealand
New Zealand secondary schools of Nelson plan construction
Educational institutions established in 1970
1970 establishments in New Zealand